The 2011 Chihuahua Express was the fifth edition of the Chihuahua Express. Michel Jourdain Jr. won this event in a Studebaker.

Results

23 of 34 teams finished the race.

Special stage

References

Chihuahua Express
Chihuahua Express
Chihuahua Express